Xerocnephasia rigana is a species of moth, belonging to the genus Xerocnephasia.

The species was described in 1829 by Carl Heinrich Wilhelm Sodoffsky as Tortrix rigana.

It is native to Europe.

References

Tortricidae